Madison City Schools is a school district headquartered in and serving Madison, Alabama.

A portion of the district is in Madison County, while the rest is in Limestone County.

Madison County Schools serves most other areas in Madison County, Alabama while Huntsville City Schools serves some others.

Schools

High schools 
 Bob Jones High School
 James Clemens High School

Middle schools 
 Discovery Middle School
 Liberty Middle School

Elementary schools 
 Columbia Elementary School
 Heritage Elementary School
 Horizon Elementary School
 Madison Elementary School
 Mill Creek Elementary School
 Rainbow Elementary School
 Midtown Elementary School

Former 

 West Madison Elementary School (1936–2021)

References

External links
 

Education in Madison County, Alabama
Education in Limestone County, Alabama
School districts in Alabama